Jessonda (minor planet designation: 549 Jessonda) is a minor planet orbiting the Sun. According to the Catalogue of Minor Planet Names and Discovery Circumstances, it is "named presumably after the character in the opera of the same name by the German composer, conductor and violinist Ludwig Spohr (1784-1859), one of the leading composers in the early romantic period.'  (Around 1904 Max Wolf named numerous asteroids he had discovered after female characters in opera.)

References

External links 
 Lightcurve plot of 549 Jessonda, Palmer Divide Observatory, B. D. Warner (2006)
 Asteroid Lightcurve Database (LCDB), query form (info )
 Dictionary of Minor Planet Names, Google books
 Asteroids and comets rotation curves, CdR – Observatoire de Genève, Raoul Behrend
 Discovery Circumstances: Numbered Minor Planets (1)-(5000) – Minor Planet Center
 
 

000549
Discoveries by Max Wolf
Named minor planets
000549
19041115